Jadwiga Wołoszyńska (5 April 1882 in Nadwórna - 30 August 1951 in Kraków) was a Polish botanist known for studying algology, limnology, and paleobotany.  She identified new types and species (e.g. Prorocentrum cassubicum (Woloszynska) Dodge (1975) of algae and studied lakes in Poland, Lithuania, Ukraine, Java, Sumatra and Africa

References

1882 births
1951 deaths
People from Nadvirna
Polish Austro-Hungarians 
People from the Kingdom of Galicia and Lodomeria
20th-century Polish women scientists
20th-century Polish botanists
Polish limnologists
University of Lviv alumni
Academic staff of Jagiellonian University
Burials at Rakowicki Cemetery